Harmonic series may refer to either of two related concepts:

Harmonic series (mathematics)
Harmonic series (music)